The Eyekit is a river in the Sakha Republic (Yakutia), Russia. It is a left tributary of the Lena.

The Eyekit flows across the Bulunsky district. The banks of the river are uninhabited.

Geography
The Eyekit is the last major tributary of the Lena before it ends in the Arctic Ocean. It originates in the southeastern slopes of the Kystyk Plateau, at the northeastern limit of the Central Siberian Plateau as the Buor-Eyekit. In its upper course it flows southeast, then it reaches a floodplain with small lakes and swamps and turns northeast. After being joined by the Tas-Eyekit from the left, it flows roughly eastwards cutting across the southern end of the Chekanovsky Ridge, north of a large bend of the Lena.

The Eyekit freezes in the first half of October and stays under ice until late May.

Tributaries 

See also
List of rivers of Russia

References

External links
Река Эйэкит - сахалыы фонограммалар (Picture of the river)
Эксперт: Люди и животные страдают от эксплуатации природы в Арктике
Mapio.net - Р. Эекит, Булунский улус, Саха
По самой большой реке России. Июль. 2017. Фотоотчет.
Rivers of the Sakha Republic
ceb:Eyekit (suba sa Rusya, lat 70,87, long 127,44)
sah:Эйэкит